Mordellistena yezoensis is a species of beetle in the family Mordellidae, and in the genus Mordellistena. It was described by Chǔjǒ in 1957.

References

External links
Coleoptera. BugGuide.

Beetles described in 1957
yezoensis